I-12 was an Imperial Japanese Navy Type A2 long-range fleet submarine that served during World War II. Designed as a submarine aircraft carrier, she was commissioned in May 1944. Her crew committed a war crime when they attacked the survivors of a ship she sank in October 1944. She was sunk in November 1944 during her first war patrol.

Design and description
Type A2 submarines were versions of the preceding Type A1 with less powerful engines, adopted to reduce their construction time. I-12 was the only submarine completed to the original Type A2 design; subsequent Type A2s were constructed to a modified design as the Type AM. Like the preceding Type A1 submarines, I-12 was fitted as a squadron flagship. She displaced  on the surface and  submerged.

For surface running, I-12 powered by two  diesel engines, each driving one propeller shaft. When submerged each propeller was driven by a  electric motor. She could reach  on the surface and  submerged.

I-12 was armed with six internal bow  torpedo tubes and carried a total of 18 Type 95 torpedoes. She also was armed with a single /40 deck gun and two twin  Type 96 anti-aircraft gun mounts.

As in Type A1 submarines, I-12′s aircraft hangar was integrated into her conning tower and faced forward, and the aircraft catapult was forward of the hangar, while the deck gun was aft of the conning tower. This allowed aircraft launching from I-12 to use the forward motion of the submarine to supplement the speed imparted by the catapult.

Construction and commissioning

Built by Kawasaki at Kobe, Japan, I-12 was laid down as Submarine No. 620 on 5 November 1942. On 5 July 1943 she was renamed I-12 and attached provisionally to the Yokosuka Naval District. She was launched on 3 August 1943 and was completed and commissioned on 25 May 1944.

Service history

May–September 1944
On the day of her commissioning, I-12 was formally attached to the Yokosuka Naval District and assigned to Submarine Squadron 11 in the 6th Fleet for work-ups. She departed Kobe, Japan, on 20 September 1944 and conducted work-ups before arriving at Kure, Japan, on 30 September 1944.

First war patrol
The staff of the Combined Fleet ordered the 6th Fleet to send a long-range submarine to disrupt Allied sea lines of communication between the United States West Coast and Hawaii, and the 6th Fleet selected I-12 for the operation. Attached directly to 6th Fleet headquarters, she departed Kobe on 4 October 1944 for her first war patrol, ordered to attack shipping along the U.S. West Coast, in the Hawaiian Islands area, in the Tahiti area, and in the Pacific Ocean east of the Marshall Islands. She proceeded through the Seto Inland Sea and Sea of Japan to Hakodate, where she paused in Hakodate Bay on 7 October 1944 for an overnight stop. She then got back underway and passed through the Tsugaru Strait into the Pacific Ocean.

During the early hours of 28 October 1944, the American 7,176-gross register ton Liberty ship  — which had departed San Francisco, California, on 24 October with 41 crewmen, 28 United States Navy Armed Guard personnel, and a United States Army cargo security officer aboard bound for Honolulu, Territory of Hawaii, with a cargo of crated and uncrated U.S. Army trucks on her deck and 6,900 tons of food and provisions and 140 or 150 tons (according to different sources) of explosives in her holds — broke radio silence for 12 minutes to report the loss overboard in heavy seas of a life raft, a common practice in peacetime to avoid unnecessary search-and-rescue operations if the raft was found, despite the suspension of such reports during World War II due to the wartime proliferation of rafts and wreckage and the need to maintain communications security. I-12, on the surface to recharge her batteries at the time, intercepted the transmission, fixed John A. Johnson′s position, and steered to intercept her. One torpedo passed about  astern of John A. Johnson and exploded  to port and astern of her, but the other hit her on her starboard side immediately forward of the bridge. The torpedo hit broke John A. Johnson′s keel, flooded her No. 3 hold, and destroyed one of her lifeboats, and she quickly lost all electrical power. The ship began to break up forward of her bridge three minutes later, and she broke in two ten minutes after the torpedo hit. One of her lifeboats foundered, but all 70 men on board abandoned her in Lifeboats No. 2 and 4 and a life raft.

I-12 surfaced 30 minutes later and steered toward the lifeboats at high speed. She attempted to ram Lifeboat No. 2, and some of its occupants jumped overboard. I-12 merely brushed the lifeboat, but immediately opened fire on its occupants and men in the water who had jumped out of the boat with her 25 mm antiaircraft guns as 10 to 15 members of her crew on deck shouted Banzai! after each burst of automatic weapons fire. For 45 minutes, I-12 moved about in the vicinity of the lifeboats, attempting to ram Lifeboat No. 4, discovering the life raft with 17 survivors aboard and opening fire on it with her 25-millimeter guns, all the while shooting any survivors she found and attempting to slice up men in the water with her propellers. She remained on the scene for another two hours, although she did not resume firing at the remaining survivors, who believed that she was waiting for dawn so that she could continue the massacre in daylight.

Just after 01:00 on 30 October 1944, a Pan American World Airways Boeing 314 Clipper flying boat flying from San Francisco to Honolulu sighted the two burning halves of John A. Johnson, the lifeboats, and I-12 on the surface nearby. The airliner's crew and passengers also saw John A. Johnson′s bow section explode at 01:05, sending flames  into the air, after which it sank. Her burning stern section remained afloat. A search-and-rescue aircraft sighted the survivors at 08:00 on 30 October, and at 14:00 Argus reached the scene and brought aboard 60 survivors. Argus disembarked the survivors at San Francisco on 3 November 1944. They described I-12 as a very large submarine, painted black or dark grey above the waterline and light grey below it, with a  horizontal stripe running around her stern.

Sources differ on casualties during the sinking and subsequent massacre, but at least six men were killed, one source claims that four crewmen, five Navy Armed Guard personnel, and the U.S. Army cargo security officer were left missing and presumed dead, and another specifies that 10 men died. Because John A. Johnson had broken in half, the Japanese erroneously credited I-12 with sinking two ships.

A U.S. Navy hunter-killer group centered around the escort carrier  began to search for I-12, and TBM Avenger aircraft from Corregidor reported that they attacked unidentified submarines on 2 and 4 November 1944.

Loss

Ardent attacked first at 12:41, firing a 24-charge pattern of Hedgehog projectiles, and again at 12:46 with a second Hedgehog pattern. No projectiles hit the submarine. Rockford left her escort station to assist, and fired her first Hedgehog barrage of 13 projectiles at 13:08; 15 seconds later her crew heard either two explosions before a large underwater detonation rocked the ship, or three distinct detonations followed four minutes later by numerous underwater explosions, according to different sources. Ardent carried out two more Hedgehog attacks and Rockford dropped 13 depth charges to ensure the submarine′s destruction. Diesel oil, air bubbles, and debris including teak deck planks, ground cork covered in diesel oil, pieces of varnished mahogany inscribed in Japanese, a wooden slat from a vegetable crate with Japanese writing and advertisements on it, and a piece of an instrument case inscribed with Japanese characters. Both Ardent and Rockford received credit for the probable destruction of a Japanese submarine, which probably was I-12.

On 19 December 1944, 6th Fleet headquarters ordered I-12 to return to Kure, but she did not acknowledge receipt of the message. However, Japanese signals intelligence intercepted Allied communications indicating the sinking of an Allied transport and tanker in the mid-Pacific Ocean between 20 and 31 December 1944 and U.S. Navy sightings of a Japanese submarine in the Hawaiian Islands area on 2 and 4 January 1945, leading the 6th Fleet staff to conclude that I-12 still was on patrol. On 31 January 1945, however, the Imperial Japanese Navy declared I-12 to be presumed lost with all 114 hands in the mid-Pacific Ocean. The Japanese removed her from the navy list on 10 August 1945.

References

Footnotes

Bibliography

 

Type A2 submarines
1943 ships
World War II submarines of Japan
Maritime incidents in November 1944
Maritime incidents in October 1944
Ships lost with all hands
Japanese war crimes
Japanese submarines lost during World War II
World War II shipwrecks in the Pacific Ocean
Ships built by Kawasaki Heavy Industries
Submarines sunk by United States warships